The Peruvian tuco-tuco (Ctenomys peruanus) is a species of rodent in the family Ctenomyidae. It is endemic to Peru and Bolivia.

References

Tuco-tucos
Mammals of Peru
Mammals of the Andes
Mammals described in 1947
Taxonomy articles created by Polbot
Taxa named by Colin Campbell Sanborn